Harlow Jewish Community, a member of the Movement for Reform Judaism, is a Reform Jewish congregation whose synagogue is at Harberts Road, Harlow, in Essex, England. The congregation dates from 1952. Irit Shillor has been its Rabbi since 2005.

See also
 List of Jewish communities in the United Kingdom
 Movement for Reform Judaism

References

External links
 Official website

1952 establishments in England
Harlow
Jewish communities in Essex
Jewish organizations established in 1952
Reform synagogues in the United Kingdom